Werner Günter Adolf Jeanrond was Professor of Systematic Theology with special responsibility for Dogmatics at the University of Oslo. He is retired.

Background 

Jeanrond is a German Roman Catholic theologian. He was born in 1955 in Saarbrücken in the Saar Protectorate, now Saarland, Germany. He was raised in Kleinblittersdorf, a village on the German-French border. His father served as the village's mayor twice. He was Professor of Systematic Theology with special responsibility for Dogmatics at the University of Oslo retiring in 2022. He was the first Catholic theologian to hold this post in the university's traditionally Lutheran Faculty of Theology.

Education and academic career 

Jeanrond studied theology, German language and literature, and educational science at the Universities of Saarbrücken, Regensburg and Chicago. In 1979, he took his master's degree (Staatsexamen) at the University of Saarbrücken. In 1984, he was awarded a PhD at the University of Chicago (under the direction of David Tracy and Paul Ricoeur) where he was a Fulbright scholar. In 1985, he was awarded the degree of MA jure officii at the University of Dublin.

From 1981 to 1994, he was Lecturer and Senior Lecturer in theology at the University of Dublin and Fellow of Trinity College. From 1995 to 2007, he was Professor of Systematic Theology at the University of Lund in Sweden. While in Lund, he supervised the doctoral dissertation of Antje Jackelén who is now the first woman to be Archbishop of Uppsala and Primate of the Church of Sweden.

From 2008 to 2012, he was Professor of Divinity holding the 1640 Chair of Divinity at the University of Glasgow. After his departure from Glasgow, he was appointed an Honorary Senior Research Fellow thus maintaining a link with that university.

From 2012 to 2018, he was Master of St Benet's Hall, a permanent private hall of the University of Oxford, and a member of the Faculty of Theology and Religion. He was the first lay Master in the history of St. Benet's Hall. As an Oxford Head of House and also as a holder of the MA from the University of Dublin, he incepted to the degree of MA ad eundem gradum at the University of Oxford.

He has academic administrative experience in a number of roles, including as Head of the School of Biblical and Theological Studies in Trinity College Dublin; as Dean of the Faculty of Theology and Vice-Dean of Humanities at Lund University; as elected member of the Swedish Research Council and the Nordic Research Council for the Humanities and Social Sciences; as Research Convenor and Deputy Head of the School of Critical Studies in the University of Glasgow; as a longtime member of the Board and Foundation of Concilium and of many other editorial and academic boards and committees.

Research interests 

Systematic theology (Doctrine of God, Christology, ecclesiology, eschatology, soteriology); theological and philosophical hermeneutics; theological method; theology of religions; theology of love; theology of hope; political theology.

Academic awards and honours 

Jeanrond was awarded a Fulbright Fellowship for his doctoral studies at the University of Chicago (1979–1981), a research fellowship at the Herzog August Library Wolfenbüttel (1989), a research fellowship at the Danish Institute for Advanced Studies in the Humanities (2002–03), a Robertson Fellowship at the University of Glasgow (2004), and a research fellowship at the Center for Subjectivity Research at the University of Copenhagen (2007).

He has held visiting professorships at the universities of Uppsala, Chicago, Regensburg, and Riga. He has delivered a number of established lectures, including the Waldenström Lectures (Stockholm), the Wesley Lectures (Gothenburg), the Donellan Lectures (Dublin), the Aquinas Lecture (Glasgow), and the Gonzaga Lecture (Glasgow), and has lectured at many universities and research institutions in Europe, Asia and North America.

Publications 
  Translated into Swedish.
  Available in Swedish only.
  Translated into Chinese, Danish, Italian, Spanish, and Swedish.
  Translated into German and Swedish.
  Translated into French, Italian, Korean, Polish and Turkish.

Festschrift/Essays in honour of Werner G Jeanrond

References

External links 
 Faculty of Theology, University of Oslo
 St Benet's Hall, Oxford
 Faculty of Theology and Religion, University of Oxford

 

Academic staff of the University of Oslo
Academics of the University of Glasgow
Academics of Trinity College Dublin
Masters of St Benet's Hall, Oxford
Living people
20th-century German Catholic theologians
21st-century German Catholic theologians
Saarland University alumni
People connected to Lund University
1955 births
German male non-fiction writers